Renwick Brook Park is an urban park located in the community of Glace Bay, part of the Cape Breton Regional Municipality in Nova Scotia, Canada.

Park layout
Renwick Brook Park lies in a shallow valley containing a brook of the same name.  The park has series of crushed limestone walking paths, the main trail looping between the foot bridge near where Commercial Street crosses the brook to a foot bridge near the intersection of Park and Brookside Streets.  The trails also continue south under Park Street, past the Cameron Bowl Ball Park crossing two more foot bridges to end at Newsom Park at Dominion Street and also looping back north to the Cameron Bowl. The pathway between Commercial Street and Park Street is illuminated at night.

The Renwick Brook valley bisects the community of Glace Bay, neatly separating it into two districts with the Renwick Brook Park's foot bridges and paths interconnecting the two. The park features walking trails, benches, flower beds, path lighting, a small dam, and pedestrian bridges crossing the brook in several places and at either end.  The area is home to several species of birds, particularly waterfowl.

History
On 4 April 1970 Inglis H. Macaulay, a member of council and Deputy Mayor for Glace Bay, proposed a development along the Renwick Brook as part of a larger municipal infrastructure project then in the planning stages. The project was ready to proceed by 1973 but the high interest rates in place at the time put the project on hold. Finally construction began in 1983, spearheaded by then Mayor of Glace Bay Bruce Allan Clark and then MP David Dingwall. The project was completed by 1986.

2009 upgrade
In 2008-2009 Renwick Brook Park underwent a $560,000 upgrade which included improvements to the trails, landscaping, and replacement of all the path lighting. A lighthouse sculpture was installed to commemorate those who initiated and contributed to the development of the park in the 1980s. A re-dedication ceremony was held on 30 October 2009.

References

External links
 Google Map of lower Renwick Brook Trail

Parks in the Cape Breton Regional Municipality